The president of the Second Chamber of the Landtag of Alsace-Lorraine was the presiding officer of the second chamber of that legislature.

Office-holder 
Eugène Ricklin 1911–1918

See also
List of presidents of the First Chamber of the Landtag of Alsace-Lorraine

Alsace
Political history of Germany